Natko Rački (born 15 November 1981) is a former Croatian football player currently without club. He has had seven caps for Croatia's U21 national team.

Career
Born in Rijeka, as a player he started with HNK Rijeka where he was top scorer during the 2001-02 season. He continued his career with Hajduk Split, winning their last league title with them in 2005, but only managed to score eight goals for the club during two seasons. His goalscoring did not improve as he moved to other clubs in Croatia.

Club statistics

Honours
Hajduk Split
Croatian First Football League: 2003-04, 2004-05

Istra 1961
Croatian Second Football League: 2008-09

References

External links
 

1981 births
Living people
Footballers from Rijeka
Association football forwards
Croatian footballers
Croatia youth international footballers
Croatia under-21 international footballers
HNK Rijeka players
HNK Hajduk Split players
NK Međimurje players
NK Pomorac 1921 players
NK Istra 1961 players
Croatian Football League players
First Football League (Croatia) players